Ikeje Israel Asogwa, popularly known as SOGGIE, is a Nigerian politician and the former Chairman of the Enugu State People's Democratic Party.

As the state party Chairman during the 2015 Nigerian general elections, especially the guber election in Enugu State, Chief Asogwa played a very active role in the emergence of the current Enugu State Governor, Rt Hon Ifeanyi Ugwuanyi of PDP.
Chief Asogwa is one of the notable Nsukka politicians within the PDP that have wanted to become the 2015 Enugu State Governorship candidate.

Background
Asogwa was formally an Estate manager in the private sector before Governor Sullivan Chime recruited him into the public sector to become the Managing Director of Enugu State Housing Development Cooperation (ESHDC).
The former Governor commended Asogwa for being one of the most outstanding administrators in Enugu State by saying " … You have been a shining star. You have shown that your appointment was not a mistake. If given the opportunity, I will appoint you a million times over."

Political career

Asogwa is a distinguished political administrator and a key player in Nigeria's democracy and Enugu State politics in particular. He became the Enugu State People's Democratic Party chairman following the resignation of the former state chairman, Engr. Vita Abba, who resigned his position to contest for the Enugu State Governorship ticket.
Asogwa was one of the gubernatorial aspirants in Enugu State under the PDP who later stepped down to allow Rt Hon Ifeanyi Ugwuanyi to emerge as the consensus guber candidate. He was later appointed as Chairman Enugu state universal basic Education board (ENSUBEB) by Governor Ifeanyi Ugwuanyi in 2016.

References

External links 
 www.example.com

Year of birth missing (living people)
Living people
Peoples Democratic Party (Nigeria) politicians
People from Enugu State
People from Enugu
Enugu State politicians
State political party chairs of Nigeria